The seventh season of the Australian competitive cooking game show My Kitchen Rules premiered on 1 February 2016.

Format changes
Special Guest Judges – This series has introduced special celebrity guest judges, who have appeared alongside the main judging panel for specific challenges.
Rachel Khoo – The UK chef assisted Colin Fassnidge as the second judge in the third round of Instant Restaurants for Group 3 teams.
Curtis Stone – Appeared as a guest judge alongside Pete and Manu during the first Sudden Death challenge in Kitchen Headquarters.
Redemption Round Double Elimination – For the first time, two teams are eliminated from a single Instant Restaurant round.
Sudden Death Format – During the first Sudden Death and Finals Decider eliminations, only Pete and Manu were present to eliminate one team. There was no scoring involved, nor did the guest judges make an appearance. For every other Sudden Death in between, the usual three-course cook-off and judging format remained.
MKR Past Contestants – For the first time ever in the series, some past MKR contestants returned to the show, judging the current teams' food for one of the challenges.

Teams

Elimination history

 Note:

Competition details

Instant Restaurants
During the Instant Restaurant rounds, each team hosts a three-course dinner for judges and fellow teams in their allocated group. They are scored and ranked among their group, with the lowest scoring team being eliminated.

Round 1
 Episodes 1 to 6
 Airdate — 1 February to 9 February
 Description — The first of the two instant restaurant groups are introduced into the competition in Round 1. The lowest scoring team at the end of this round is eliminated.

Round 2
 Episodes 7 to 12
 Airdate — 10 February to 21 February
 Description — The second group now start their Instant Restaurant round. The same rules from the previous round apply and the lowest scoring team is eliminated.

Round 3
 Episodes 13 to 18
 Airdate — 22 February to 1 March
 Description — The teams of group 3 join the competition and start their Instant Restaurant round. Colin Fassnidge is joined by new judge, Rachel Khoo to score and judge this group. at the end of the round, the lowest scoring team is eliminated.

Round 4: Redemption Round
 Episodes 19 to 24
 Airdate — 2 March to 13 March
 Description — The 4th and 5th placed teams from each of the previous three rounds must compete in a fourth Instant Restaurant Redemption round. At the end of this round, two teams are eliminated. Unlike the previous rounds, the final result was not determined by the rankings of the current scores. A twist was revealed where the teams were safe or eliminated based on the difference between scores from their first round to their current score from this round.

Top 13

People's Choice 1: RSL Buffet Challenge
 Episode 25
 Airdate — 14 March
 Location — North Ryde RSL
Description — In the first challenge, teams were split into two groups each cooking a buffet meal for public guests at the North Ryde RSL. Both groups selected a theme for their buffet and the guests paid for what they think the group's buffet was worth. The group with the most money won the collective People's Choice whilst the losing group heads into the first Sudden Death Cook-Off. Each team specifically focused on their own dish within their group and Pete and Colin selected the single best dish as their favourite, making that team safe from two eliminations.

Kitchen HQ: Banquet Cook-Off
 Episode 26
 Airdate — 15 March
 Description — The losing five teams from the previous challenge faced off against each other in a two-part Sudden Death. The first cook-off saw all teams cooking a banquet dish to all remaining safe teams, Pete, Manu and special guest judge Curtis Stone. The two weakest teams, competed in a final cook-off, where the losing team is eliminated. The winning team advanced through to the Top 12.

Top 12

People's Choice 2: Athlete's Challenge 
 Episode 27
 Airdate — 16 March 2016
 Location — Sydney Olympic Park
Description — Teams cooked a healthy dish for 200 members of the Australian Olympic team. The athletes voted for their favourite dish, with the team earning the most votes being safe from two eliminations. The two weakest teams selected by Pete and Colin are sent to the first Sudden Death Cook-Off, where one is eliminated.

Sudden Death Cook-Off 1
 Episode 28
 Airdate — 21 March 2016
Description — Luciano & Martino and Gianni & Zana failed to impress the judges in the Athlete's Challenge and have to compete against each other in the first Sudden Death Cook-Off, where one team is eliminated. The winning team goes through to the Top 11.

Top 11

People's Choice 3: Fisherman's Challenge
 Episode 29
 Airdate — 22 March 2016
 Location — Cockatoo Island
Description — Teams cooked a seafood dish for 100 Fishermen and their families at the dock yards on Sydney’s Cockatoo Island. The team given the most votes by the fishermen won the Fisherman's Choice earning them safety from the next two eliminations.

 Note:
 - Due to an accident off camera, Rosie and Paige did not participate in this challenge for safety reasons.

Sudden Death Cook-Off 2
 Episode 30
 Airdate — 23 March 2016
Description — Alex & Gareth and JP & Nelly did not impress the judges at the Fishermans Challenge and must go head to head in the third Sudden Death Cook-Off. The team with the lower score will be eliminated and the surviving team will proceed through to the Top 10

Top 10

People's Choice 4: Pop-up Cinema
 Episode 31
 Airdate — 28 March 2016
 Location — Carriageworks, Eveleigh
Description — The teams are challenged to cook a family dinner box, consisting of one main element and two accompanying sides for 300 people attending a pop-up cinema event. Moviegoers will taste the boxes and vote for their favourite meals and team with the most votes will be saved from the next two eliminations.

Sudden Death Cook-Off 3
 Episode 32
 Airdate — 29 March 2016
Description — Rosie and Paige along with Alex and Gareth were the weakest teams from the Pop-up Cinema Challenge and will go head to head in the fourth Sudden Death Cook-Off. The team who receives the lower score will be eliminated and the surviving team will go through to the Top 9.

Top 9

People's Choice 5: Rodeo Challenge
 Episode 33
 Airdate — 30 March 2016
 Location — Luddenham Showground
Description — The teams were tasked to barbecue for 200 rodeo riders and their families. The rodeo riders will taste and vote for their favourite meals and team with the most votes wins Rider's Choice and is saved from the next two eliminations. The four weakest teams, chosen by Pete and Colin were sent to a following Kitchen HQ challenge.

Kitchen HQ: Alumni Challenge
 Episode 34
 Airdate — 3 April 2016
Description — In a special Kitchen HQ challenge, the Bottom 4 teams from the previous challenge had their food judged by notable contestants from previous series of MKR. At the end of this cook-off, two teams are sent to Sudden Death, one sent by judges Pete and Manu, and the second sent by the alumni teams. The MKR alumni returning include:-
Robert & Lynzey, Ash & Camilla and winners, Will & Steve from 2015 (series 6)
Carly & Tresne, Helena & Vikki, and runners up, Chloe & Kelly from 2014 (series 5)
Angela & Melina, Sophia and winners, Dan & Steph from 2013 (series 4)
Runners-up, Nic & Rocco and winner, Jennifer from 2012 (series 3)

Sudden Death Cook-Off 4
 Episode 35
 Airdate — 4 April 2016
Description — Eve & Jason and Mike & Tarq as the weakest teams from the Alumni Challenge, battle it out in the fifth Sudden Death Cook-Off. The team who receives the lower score will be eliminated and the surviving team will be safe and join the Top 8.

Top 8

People's Choice 6: Coles Family Favourites
 Episode 36
 Airdate — 5 April 2016
 Location — West Ryde Coles
Description — The teams were challenged to create a family favourite meal in a Coles supermarket. They must create a recipe, cook and serve in-store. The team receiving the most votes won Customers' Choice, safe from two eliminations and have their recipe featured in the Coles magazine. The two weakest teams will be sent to sudden death cook-off.

Sudden Death Cook-Off 5
 Episode 37
 Airdate — 6 April 2016
Description — Rosie & Paige and Gianni & Zana failed to impress the judges in the Family Favourites Challenge and have to compete against each other in the sixth Sudden Death Cook-Off, where one team will be eliminated. The winning team goes through to the Top 7.

Top 7

People's Choice 7: 4Fourteen Chef's Table
 Episode 38
 Airdate — 10 April 2016
 Location — 4Fourteen restaurant, Surry Hills
Description — The teams headed to Colin Fassnidge’s 4Fourteen restaurant to create a main course dish. A panel of Colin's chef and management staff voted for the best dish, which will be placed on the 4Fourteen menu. That team also receives an advantage at the following challenge. The two weakest scoring dishes selected by judges will face off in the next Sudden Death elimination.

Sudden Death Cook-Off 6
 Episode 39
 Airdate — 11 April 2016
Description — The two weakest teams from the 4Fourteen Challenge will go head-to-head in the seventh Sudden Death Cook-Off, where one team will be eliminated. The winning team goes through to the Top 6.

Top 6

Kitchen HQ: Finals Decider
 Episode 40
 Airdate — 12 April 2016
 Description — In the Finals Decider, teams first competed in a rapid cook-off and had 45 minutes to create a dish using two ingredients that are normally an unusual combination. The six combinations of ingredients were set, with Anna and Jordan allocating each team their ingredients as their advantage from winning the previous challenge. Four teams became safe after the first cook-off, with the remaining two competing in a final Sudden Death cook-off, where the weaker team is eliminated and the winning team to join the Top 5.

Top 5

Ultimate Instant Restaurant
 Episodes 41 to 45
 Airdate — 13 to 20 April 2016
 Description — For the start of the finals round, the Top 5 teams head around the country once again in an Ultimate Instant Restaurant round. All teams have to cook two dishes of each course (entree, main and dessert) for their fellow finalists and judges for scoring. Guests have a choice of choosing one of the options per course while the judges Pete and Manu each taste one of the two options. The lowest scoring team is eliminated as the remaining four teams are ranked into the semifinals.

 Colour key:
  – Judge's score for course option 1
  – Judge's score for course option 2

 Note
 – Individual guest scores were not revealed.

Semi-finals

Semi-final 1
 Episode 46
 Airdate — 21 April 2016
 Description — Gianni & Zana take on Tasia & Gracia in the first Semi-Final Cook-Off. The lower scoring team is eliminated and the winner proceeds through to the Grand Final.

Semi-final 2
 Episode 47
 Airdate — 25 April 2016
 Description — Anna & Jordan take on Carmine & Lauren in the second Semi-Final Cook-Off. The lower scoring team is eliminated and the winner proceeds through to the Grand Final.

Grand Final
 Episode 48
 Airdate — 26 April 2016
 Description — In the final cook-off for the series, the top 2 teams face-off in the ultimate Grand Final. Teams each cook a five course menu, with 20 plates of each course, totalling 100 plates per team, served to eliminated teams, friends and family. Guest judges returned for the final verdict of awarding the $250,000 prize to the winners. Teams also wear chef attire and have their Instant Restaurant represented.

Ratings
 Colour key:
  – Highest Rating
  – Lowest Rating
  – Elimination Episode
  – Finals Week

Ratings data used is from OzTAM and represents the live and same day average viewership from the 5 largest Australian metropolitan centres (Sydney, Melbourne, Brisbane, Perth and Adelaide).

References

2016 Australian television seasons
My Kitchen Rules